Daniel and The Towers is a television film featuring the famous folk art masterpiece, the Watts Towers (located in the Watts neighborhood of Los Angeles), and their creator Simon Rodia's friendship with a 10-year-old neighborhood boy.

The story itself, and the friendship it describes, are fiction; however, Simon Rodia did build the towers. Some of the neighborhood situations that the film portrays are factually based.

Plot

Cast
In Credits Order

Crew

Writers

In Alphabetical Order
Anton Kline
Jessie Nelson
Camille Thomasson
Stephen Tolkin

Producers
Christopher Chase: Associate Producer
Judith James: Producer (as Judith Rutherford James)
Michael D. Pariser: Line Producer

Original Music
Dennis Dreith

Cinematography
Tom Hurwitz

Film Editing
Norman Hollyn

Casting
Vicki Hillman

Production Design
John Ivo Gilles

Costume Design
Heidi Freundlich Gilles (as Heidi Freundlich-Gilles)

Makeup Department
Marietta Carter-Narcisse: Hair Assistant (as Marietta Carter)
Marietta Carter-Narcisse: Makeup Assistant (as Marietta Carter)
Robin Siegel: Hair Stylist
Robin Siegel: Makeup Artist

Distribution Information
The drama, under the WonderWorks Family Movie tag, came to television in 1987  and was released on VHS in 1992 .

Runtime: 61 min
Country: United States
Language: English
Color: Color

Awards
The movie was nominated by the Young Artist Awards in 1988  as "Best Television Family Special, Movie of the Week or Variety Show" and Miguel Alamo was nominated for "Best Young Actor Starring in a Television Drama Special, Movie of the Week or Variety Show".

External links
 

1987 films
1987 drama films
American television films
Films with screenplays by Stephen Tolkin